Frederick Robert Zimmerman (November 20, 1880December 14, 1954) was a German American politician from Milwaukee, who served as the 25th Governor of Wisconsin.  He served before and after his governorship as Wisconsin Secretary of State—for a total of eighteen years in that office.  He also served one term in the Wisconsin State Assembly. His son, Robert C. Zimmerman, was also Wisconsin Secretary of State from 1957 until 1975.

Background and early career 
Zimmerman was born in Milwaukee, son of Charles E. Zimmerman and Augusta Fiesenhauser Zimmerman.  He was a grandson of German-American Forty-Eighters. His father was born in New York state and came to Milwaukee in 1875. His mother was born in Wisconsin of parents who were natives of Stuttgart. Zimmerman's father, a molder, died when he was 5 and at an early age he began contributing to the support of his family by selling newspapers. After completing grammar school, he attended night school briefly, and held various jobs until he was 22, when he started the Bee Hive Dairy, distributing milk to Milwaukee residents. He left this job, after his marriage, to take a position as a traveling salesman with the Pfister & Vogel Leather Company, and also worked as a bookkeeper for a Milwaukee lumber firm.

Elective office

Legislature 
Zimmerman was elected to the Wisconsin State Assembly by six votes in 1908 in a three-way race, receiving 1703 votes on the Republican ticket to 1697 for Democrat Harry R. McLogan, and 1159 for Socialist Gilbert H. Poor, to represent the 8th Milwaukee County district (8th and 23d wards of the City of Milwaukee). He was an active member of the Progressive faction of his party, but served only one term (1909–1910), losing the 1910 election in a four-way contest to Socialist James H. Vint with 1521 votes, to 1501 for Zimmerman, 143 for McLogan, and 12 for Prohibitionist William H. Trout.

Secretary of State 
In 1922, Zimmerman (by then an industrial relations manager for Nash Motors) had moved to the Town of Lake and served two years on the Town Board. He received the Republican nomination and election as Wisconsin Secretary of State in 1922 (with 77.7% of the vote in a four-way race) and re-election in 1924 in a five-way race, earning a then-record 509,771 votes statewide. During this period he remained closely identified with the Progressive faction of the Republican Party.

Governor 
When the Progressives refused to endorse him in the gubernatorial election in 1926 (because of his failure to support the 1924 presidential candidacy of Robert M. La Follette Sr.), Zimmerman ran in the Republican primary election as an "independent" against both Progressive (Herman Ekern) and Stalwart (Charles B. Perry) candidates, as well as another "independent". Zimmerman won the Republican nomination and was elected by an absolute majority, outpolling Perry (who came in second, running as an independent), as well as the Democratic, Socialist, Prohibitionist and Socialist Labor candidates combined, with 350,927 votes out of 552,921. In 1928 he was defeated for re-nomination, running a poor third to Stalwart Walter J. Kohler Sr., and Progressive Congressman Joseph D. Beck. 
 
Thereafter he went into a political decline for several years, briefly holding a position in the Beverage Tax Commission in 1936.

Secretary of State once more 
Zimmerman was nominated and elected Secretary of State on the Republican ticket in 1938 and served until his death, polling a larger vote at each subsequent election and in 1952 again received the highest total ever given any candidate for any office in the state.

Private life 
Zimmerman was a delegate to the Republican National Conventions in 1916, 1920, 1924, 1940, and 1944. He was attacked as a member of America First, but he denied membership therein, although he generally followed isolationist positions. He died in Milwaukee in 1954 just after again winning re-election as Secretary of State.

References

Further reading 
"Former Governors of Wisconsin, 1848-1960: Fred R. Zimmerman" in Toepel, M. G.; Kuehn, Hazel L., eds. The Wisconsin blue book, 1960 Madison: State of Wisconsin, 1960; pp. 167-170.

1880 births
1954 deaths
American people of German descent
Republican Party members of the Wisconsin State Assembly
Republican Party governors of Wisconsin
Secretaries of State of Wisconsin
Politicians from Milwaukee
20th-century American politicians